The Lagunitas School District is a public K–8 school district located 18 miles northwest of San Francisco in western-central Marin County, California. The district serves students in the unincorporated San Geronimo Valley, including Woodacre, San Geronimo, Forest Knolls, and Lagunitas.

Graduates of the middle school usually attend Archie Williams High School, which is part of the Tamalpais Union High School District. The District is within the boundaries of the Marin Community College District.

Schools 
The district operates two schools: Lagunitas Elementary and San Geronimo Valley Elementary. Both are located at the same address in San Geronimo, and share the same principal and superintendent Laura Shain.

Lagunitas Elementary includes a Montessori program serving grades K-5, which is the only public Montessori school in Marin County, and a middle school serving grades 6-8. San Geronimo Valley Elementary serves grades K-6 with its Open Classroom program.

There are currently three Open Classroom teachers, three Montessori teachers, five middle school teachers, one RSP special education teacher, and five administrative staff, as well as the principal/superintendent, Laura Shain.

References

External links 

 

School districts in Marin County, California
Mill Valley, California